Tempo (Serbian Cyrillic: Teмпo) was a Serbia-based magazine devoted to sports, published weekly.

Beginnings
Tempo was founded in Belgrade in 1966, as a weekly sports magazine under Politika's umbrella. Most of its coverage centered on football, with basketball, handball, volleyball, and water polo also featuring prominently. For decades, Tempo was famous among the youth of SFR Yugoslavia for publishing glossy color posters of their favourite domestic and foreign sporting heroes.

With internet sporting sites and specialty TV sports channels gradually eating into its readership since the early 2000s, Tempo folded on July 7, 2004. It was the publication's 1879th issue and its cover featured the Greece national football team that had just won EURO 2004.

Brief rebirth (2007–2009)
In 2007, Tempo 21 launched. One of the main theories as to why the 21 was added to their name was that it was meant to symbolize the magazine's rebirth in the 21st century. A new issue was released every other Wednesday, and was sold in Serbia the  Serbian diaspora. In early 2009 ceased publication.

References

1966 establishments in Yugoslavia
2004 disestablishments in Serbia
Defunct magazines published in Serbia
Defunct magazines published in Yugoslavia
Magazines established in 1966
Magazines disestablished in 2004
Mass media in Belgrade
Magazines published in Serbia
Serbian-language magazines
Sports magazines
Weekly magazines
Magazines published in Yugoslavia